George Cowper (1869 – 16 April 1932) was an Australian cricketer. He played six first-class matches for New South Wales between 1888/89 and 1889/90.

See also
 List of New South Wales representative cricketers

References

External links
 

1869 births
1932 deaths
Australian cricketers
New South Wales cricketers
Sportspeople from Bendigo